Vahbbiz Dorabjee is an Indian television actress and model.

Career

Vahbiz Dorabjee made her television debut with the television serial Pyaar Kii Ye Ek Kahaani, playing the role of Panchi Dobriyal.  from 18 October 2010 to 15 December 2011. In 2013 she played the role of Alak in the television series Saraswatichandra. She has won an award for the best supporting role in 2011 for Pyaar Kii Ye Ek Kahaani. She was part of the television series Bahu Hamari Rajni Kant, where she played the role of Maggie Kant.

Personal life

She was born in Pune, Maharashtra into a Parsi family. Her father name is Jehangir Dorabjee and mother name is Firoza Dorabjee. They are known entrepreneurs of Pune.

In 2013, Dorabjee married her Pyaar Kii Ye Ek Kahaani co-star Vivian Dsena.
They got divorced in 2017.

Television

Showbiz with Vahbiz

Vahbiz Dorabjee hosted the web show "Showbiz with Vahbiz", in which various TV actors were interviewed. It was more like a fun talk show. The showbiz was powered by IWMBuzz and aired on YouTube in 2017.

See also
 List of Indian television actresses

References

External links

 
 

Living people
Parsi people
Actresses from Pune
Indian television actresses
Actresses in Hindi television
21st-century Indian actresses
1985 births